La Dura Dura is a  sport climbing route on the limestone cliffs at Peramola, a village in Oliana, Spain. The route was bolted and developed by American climber Chris Sharma in 2009 who had almost given up believing he could climb it until a collaboration with Czech climber Adam Ondra led to Ondra climbing the route on 7 February 2013, followed by Sharma on 23 March 2013.  

The route has not been repeated since Ondra's and Sharma's 2013 ascents. Being two of the leading rock climbers in the world at that time, their unique collaboration was widely followed in the climbing media; it is an important route in rock climbing history.

History 

American climber Chris Sharma had been pushing the standards of sport climbing, freeing Realization in 2001, the first consensus , and then freeing Jumbo Love in 2008, the first consensus .  Sharma bolted La Dura Dura in 2009, saying: "If you're going to spend so much time on something, the line must really be worthwhile and it's difficult to find something that is at your limit and also fits your style";  and also, that "it was a beautiful, if blank-looking, streak of blue and white limestone".  Sharma became disillusioned at the feasibility of the route due to the tiny "crimper" moves on the first 10 metres of the route, and by 2011 had almost abandoned his project saying, "I figured it would be for the next generation".

Sharma invited Czech climber Adam Ondra to see if he could solve the route, and they spent early 2012 alternating belays and ideas on how to climb it, and in particular, the first part of the route where the bouldering grade was a near . The pair suspended their work until the end of that year when Ondra made five trips over nine weeks to Oliana, and eventually free climbed the route on 7 February 2013.  Ondra said that solving the crux 15-move bouldering problem at the start of the climb, took eight of the nine weeks.  Sharma did the second ascent on 23 March 2013.

Ondra said that Change suited his style better and only took him five weeks to complete, whereas La Dura Dura was "more straightforward climbing, but you really need to get everything wired 100%", and that:  "I'd say that for me La Dura Dura is a better achievement because it fits my style less". Sharma agreed with Ondra on the grade adding: "Well if Adam thinks it is 9b+ it probably is, he probably knows more about this grade than anybody so he's sure to be right".

The route caught the climbing world's imagination and attention, not only for its technical challenges and the likelihood that any successful ascent could see a breakthrough in the world's highest climbing grade but also for the unique collaboration between what were arguably the two strongest sport climbers in the world (Sharma, the 31-year old legend, and Ondra, the 20-year old prodigy).  This was amplified when climbing filmmaker Josh Lowell produced a film in 2012 documenting their collaboration on the route (part of Reel Rock 7), which was subsequently updated in 2013 to include their ascents (reissued in 2014 as La Dura Complete). Both Ondra and Shama declared the collaboration to be a very positive experience with Shama saying post his March ascent: "I'd practically written the route off and when we decided to work it together he [Ondra] brought it back to life. It was a healthy process for both of us, we fed off each other's motivation and through him, I think I became a better climber myself".

Route 

The most technically difficult part is the first 10-metre section, which Ondra and Sharma described as "really bouldery" with 15 moves that would constitute a  climb on their own. Ondra described this first section as requiring big reaches on crimpy holds and underclings, which lead to a "huge span rightward onto a crimp, and dyno from there onto a good hueco".

After the bouldering section is a 10-metre  section with a 4-metre climb to a kneebar, which Ondra described as "super-awkward and tricky" and "Not a proper no-hands rest, but it is possible to cool down a little". After the kneebar, the next 6-metres are described as "really intense", with "a shoulder-breaking dyno into big reaches on pinches and crimps with two 'stop' moves right below the jug". Both Ondra and Sharma took many falls in this section.

Legacy
In August 2022, French climber Seb Bouin, and climbing partner of Ondra, made the third ascent of Change and felt the discovery of a kneebar graded it  (5.15b/c), thus making La Dura Dura the world's first 9b+.

The climbing media have speculated on why La Dura Dura had not had a third ascent (even by 2022, when the 9b+ route from 2020, Bibliographie, was repeated twice).

Outside called the effort a "near Shakespearean drama".  After Ondra's ascent of La Dura Dura and Change, National Geographic added Ondra to this 2013 list of "Adventurers of the Year", and noted the significance of Ondra and Sharma's collaboration as being a defining moment in the sport of rock climbing, when the title of "world's best climber" had begun to pass from one generation to the next.

Wildfire 
In June of 2022 a wildfire broke out nearby, which affected the crag that holds La Dura Dura. The extent of the damage is unclear.

Ascents 
La Dura Dura has been ascended by:
 1st Adam Ondra, 7 February 2013
 2nd Chris Sharma, 23 March 2013

Filmography
 Ondra and Shama's 2012 attempts: 
 Ondra and Shama's 2013 ascents:

See also
History of rock climbing
List of first ascents (sport climbing)
Silence, first climb in the world with a potential grade of 
Jumbo Love, first climb in the world with a consensus grade of 
Realization/Biographie, first/second climb in the world with a consensus grade of 
Action Directe, first climb in the world with a consensus grade of 
Hubble, first climb in the world with a consensus grade of

Notes

References

External links
VIDEO: La Dura Complete: The Full Story Of The Hardest Rock Climb In The World, Climbing (March 2014)

Climbing routes
2013 in sport climbing
Climbing areas of Spain
Sport climbing